Cabot Circus is a covered shopping centre in Bristol, England. It is adjacent to Broadmead, a shopping district in Bristol city centre. The Cabot Circus development area contains shops, offices, a cinema, hotel and 250 apartments. It opened in September 2008, after a ten-year planning and building project costing £500 million.

History

Site
Before the building of Cabot Circus the site contained post-war shopping units and part of the A4044 Bristol inner ring road. Tollgate House and its car park were also demolished, for the re-aligned part of the ring road and the Cabot Circus car park. Many old streets were wiped off the map, although these had long been devoid of their houses.

The original chosen name 'Merchants Quarter' came under criticism due to its associations to the slave trade.
The name of Cabot was chosen following a public vote taken in November 2007, and commemorates John Cabot, an Italian explorer who is closely associated with Bristol.
Work began on the site in September 2005,
following planning approval in December 2003.
Cabot Circus comprises three multi-level pedestrianised streets, with apartment block areas. Its focal point, The Circus, has a large glass-panelled roof. The centre won the 2008 BREEAM Retail award for its sustainable design,
including its natural ventilation, low energy lighting and rainwater harvesting system.
The complex was opened to shoppers on 25 September 2008. Cabot Circus was designed by Chapman Taylor architects.

In October 2017, prominent urban explorer Ally Law was arrested for trespassing onto the roof of Cabot Circus and performing stunts such as backflips atop the glass roof structure.

Retailers
Cabot Circus has over 130 shops, two department stores, several restaurants, a thirteen-screen Showcase Cinema de Lux, a Jungle Rumble Adventure Golf centre and is split into two areas, the circus itself and Quakers Friars. The Circus is divided into three streets and multiple levels. Outlets include New Look, Urban Outfitters, Zara, Hollister Co, H&M, The Body Shop, JD Sports, Pull & Bear, Smiggle, Boux Avenue and House of Fraser. Above at the highest level are the cinema and eateries which includes Giraffe, Bella Italia, Frankie & Benny's, Nando's, YO! Sushi, Zizzi and Gourmet Burger Kitchen. There are also cafes and restaurants on the upper ground floor, these include Five Guys, TGI Friday's and Pret a Manger. On the opposite side of Penn street is the Quakers Friars area, which houses Harvey Nichols having been opened by Dita Von Teese. Other outlets in the area include French Connection, Hugo Boss, Michael Kors, Kurt Geiger, Fat Face and an Apple Store. Philadelphia Street studios, which closed in 2014, has also been used for exhibitions and gallery hire by various Bristol based art galleries including Antlers Gallery. Here they held exhibitions such as Dark Suits which ran from 9 April - 6 May 2011, Still Chaos, which ran from 3–27 May 2012. Antlers Gallery also hosted their Winter Shop at the gallery space in 2011. In January 2016, the American womenswear and lingerie retailer, Victoria's Secret, opened their first store in the South West.

Transport
Cabot Circus is at the junction of the A4044 and A4032, close to the end of the M32 motorway.

Private vehicles
Cabot Circus has 2,500 car parking spaces, with disabled and "parent and toddler bays, plus electric car bays equipped with chargers. Prices are biased towards short-stay shoppers, with a low-cost evening parking rate available from 5pm."

Drivers can also access the centre by using one of Bristol's three Park and Ride services; Long Ashton, Portway and Bath Road.
From September to December 2008, there was a temporary weekend park and ride scheme from Frenchay to Cabot Circus.

Public transport
The closest train station to Cabot Circus is Bristol Temple Meads Station, while many bus routes also stop around Cabot Circus including routes: 6, 7, 8, 9, 24, 35, 36, 41, 42, 43, 44, 45, 48, 48A, 49, 72, 72a, 178, 376, UWE and a free minibus that runs from Cabot Circus to various locations in Bristol.

Local community response

In 2002, local newsletter The Bristolian reported, "Last Thursday residents of St Pauls met to oppose the Broadmead development: "Is Our Community under threat from Big Business Developers?" "The Broadmead Expansion Plan, backed by the council, will mean a massive increase in traffic congestion, pollution and parking chaos."

Bristolians and Bristol-based organisations have used Bristol Indymedia to criticise the development and the impacts it will have on their city. On the day of its launch, activists hung a banner from part of the development saying "crunch the cabot credit circus", linking the opening of a multimillion-pound retail development with the late 2008 economic climate and global credit crunch.

See also
 The Galleries, Bristol – a nearby shopping centre 0.4 miles away.
 Trinity Leeds, a similar development in Leeds also by Architect Chapman Taylor.

References

External links

 Official website
 BBC News – Cabot Circus
 Babylon Towers, a critique of the Cabot Circus development

Buildings and structures in Bristol
Shopping centres in Bristol
Shopping malls established in 2008